SDW may refer to:
Sandwich railway station, station code
Seven dirty words
South Downs Way
Spin density wave
Static discharge wick, a device attached to the trailing edge of an aircraft's wing to deflect lightning
.sdw is a file extension used by StarOffice Writer
 SDW (TV station), a digital television station in Western Australia, part of the West Digital Television network
 Six-Day War
 Swedich Drunken Wikings